Mana Midiyithu is a 1995 Indian Kannada-language romance film directed by M. S. Rajashekar based on novel of same name by Ashwini. The film stars Shiva Rajkumar, in his 25th feature film, and Priya Raman, making her Kannada debut,. The film's soundtrack and score was composed by Upendra Kumar.

Cast 
 Shiva Rajkumar
 Priya Raman
 Srinath
 Ramakrishna
 Tara
 Jayanthi
 Jai Jagadish
 Balaraj
 H. G. Dattatreya
 M. S. Umesh

Soundtrack 
The soundtrack of the film was composed by Upendra Kumar.

References

External links 

 Mana Midiyithu (1995)

1995 films
1990s Kannada-language films
Indian romance films
1990s romance films
Films directed by M. S. Rajashekar